Mike Jones (born September 1, 1995) is a professional Canadian football defensive back for the BC Lions of the Canadian Football League (CFL).

College career
Jones played college football for the North Carolina Central Eagles from 2013 to 2016 and the Temple Owls in 2017.

Professional career

New York Giants
Jones was originally signed as an undrafted free agent in 2018 by the New York Giants of the National Football League (NFL), but was released.

Winnipeg Blue Bombers
Jones signed with the Winnipeg Blue Bombers on April 29, 2019. After spending two seasons with the Blue Bombers, Jones won two Grey Cup championships with the team. He became a free agent upon the expiry of his contract on February 8, 2022.

Montreal Alouettes
On February 8, 2022, Jones signed with the Montreal Alouettes as a free agent. He played in all 18 regular season games where he had 47 defensive tackles, one special teams tackle, one interception, and one forced fumble. He became a free agent on February 14, 2023.

BC Lions
On February 16, 2023, it was announced that Howsare had signed with the BC Lions.

References

External links
BC Lions bio

1995 births
Living people
American football defensive backs
Canadian football defensive backs
Montreal Alouettes players
Players of American football from Baltimore
Temple Owls football players
North Carolina Central Eagles football players
New York Giants players
Winnipeg Blue Bombers players
BC Lions players